The Stage House Inn is located in Scotch Plains, Union County, New Jersey, United States. The inn was built in 1737 and was added to the National Register of Historic Places on April 15, 1982.

Through its history, the inn has also been known as Ye Olde Historical Inn, the Stanbury Inn, Ye Olde Tavern, the W.L. Deegans Hotel, Sutton's Tavern, and De Boud's Hotel.

The inn sat prominently on the Old York Road, where it was a regular stop for stagecoaches on the "Swift Sure Stage Line" between New York City and Philadelphia.

It was a primary meeting place for troop messengers and officers during the Revolutionary War; in fact, General Lafayette is known to have stopped at the inn while General George Washington was nearby.

When President Abraham Lincoln called additional troops to defend the Union during the American Civil War, rallies were held in the Stage House Inn.

The building is currently used as a part of the "Stage House Tavern," a restaurant and bar opened in 2003.

See also 
 National Register of Historic Places listings in Union County, New Jersey

References

Hotel buildings on the National Register of Historic Places in New Jersey
Commercial buildings completed in 1737
Buildings and structures in Union County, New Jersey
Scotch Plains, New Jersey
National Register of Historic Places in Union County, New Jersey
New Jersey Register of Historic Places
1737 establishments in New Jersey